Susquehanna Township may refer to the following places:

 Susquehanna Township, Lycoming County, Pennsylvania
 Susquehanna Township, Juniata County, Pennsylvania
 Susquehanna Township, Dauphin County, Pennsylvania
 Susquehanna Township, Cambria County, Pennsylvania
 Susquehanna Township, Hutchinson County, South Dakota

See also
Susquehanna (disambiguation)

Township name disambiguation pages
Pennsylvania township disambiguation pages